Mahanayak is a 1985 drama film written and directed by Alamgir Kabir. The film is based on the love story of an unemployed youth. Bulbul Ahmed played the main character. Other characters include Kajori, Julia, Rina Khan, Shawkat Akbar, Ahmed Sharif and others.

Plot
Unemployed Rana is not getting a job. He stays in the same room with his friend Dildar. Dildar takes him to his master. With the permission of Ustad Kalu Khan, he started stealing people's wallets. Dildar trained him in the pickpocketing. But after he is caught, he goes to Peter Saxena. Peter invites him to join his smuggling. Rana responds and goes to see Peter in his office. But Kalu's man sees it and informs Kalu. Kalu threatens Rana. Rana conspires with Peter and calls Kalu to a garden house and kills him.

Peter introduces him to the buyers of his diamond business and sends him to Thailand. In Thailand, Peter's men welcomed him. There he met a semi-Bengali semi-Thai Linda. Linda shows him around Thailand. In the meantime, his relationship with Linda became closer. But he has to return to Bangladesh. He has to go back to Kathmandu, Nepal. There, Peter's business friend went to Joshi's hotel. When Shila, Joshi's assistant, leaked all the details of their business to him, Rana persuaded Joshi to do the same. Joshi calls Peter away from Bangladesh and at one stage of the argument, Joshi is shot by Peter. When Rana chased him, Joshi fell down the hill and died.

Rana returned to Bangladesh and proposed marriage to the receptionist Rehana. Although Rehana was reluctant at first, she agreed considering Rana's finances. But the next day he learns that Rana has actually avenged his previous insults. After the death of Kalu Khan, Dildar wants to work under him. The two were planning to make a film when singer Yasmin Khan was caught stealing her jewelry. Yasmin tells them to leave town. This is how his life continues to deceive people.

Cast

 Bulbul Ahmed - Rana Rahman
 Kajori - Layla
 Julia - Yasmin Khan
 Rina Khan - Rehana, receptionist
 Sumita Chowdhury - Linda Laskar
 Suborna Pokhrel - Shila
 Shawkat Akbar - Mr. Khan
 Ahmed Sharif - Peter Saxena
 Baby Zaman - Ustad Kalu Kha
 Dildar - Dildar
 Keramat Moula - Joshi
 Jahanara Buiya - Mrs. Khan
 Utpal Barua
 Tapan Ghosh
 Aminul Haque
 Shibli Sadik - Ramu Barua
 Ashish Kumar Louho - Diamond purchaser
 Amol Bose - Diamond purchaser
 Arup Ratan Chowdhury - Mr. Fakhruddin
 Manjurul Islam Manju
 Ranu
 Maya Chowdhury
 Saifuddin Ahmed (guest appearance)
 Jahirul Haque (guest appearance)
 Sumita Devi (guest appearance)

Music

Sheikh Sadi Khan has directed the music for the film. Songs were composed by Masud Karim, Moniruzzaman Monir, Nazrul Islam Babu and Zahidul Haque. The songs is sung by Runa Laila, Andrew Kishore, Subir Nandi, Haimanti Sukla and Sabina Yasmin.

Assessment

Reception
Film critic Rahman Moti praised the creativity in directing the film and the acting of Bulbul Ahmed. According to him, love, deception, conscience all make Mahanayak a complete film.

Award

References

External links
 

Bengali-language Bangladeshi films
1980s Bengali-language films
1980s romance films
1980s adventure films
Bangladeshi romance films
Films shot in Thailand
Films shot in Kathmandu
Films shot in Myanmar